Club Deportivo Olímpico Litoral   is a Salvadoran professional football club based in Loma Larga, La Unión Department,  El Salvador.

The club currently plays in the Tercera Division de Fútbol Salvadoreño.

Honours

Domestic honours
 Segunda División Salvadorean and predecessors 
 Champions (1) : TBD
 Tercera División Salvadorean and predecessors 
 Champions:(1) : TBD

Notable Players
  Raul Salamanca
  Andres Barrera
  Armando Alvarenga
  Pedro Neftali Castro
  Enrique del cid
  Angel Barrera
  Pedro Maltez
  Martin Rivera
  Ricardo Granados
  Alcides Salinas

List of coaches
  William Chevez (2017)
  Roberto Chavez (September 2022- November 2022)
  Marvin Rosales (September 2022, 1 game)
  William Chevez (November 2022-Present)

External links
 https://www.facebook.com/ClubDeportivoOlimpicoLitoral

Football clubs in El Salvador